Charpentry is a commune in the Meuse department in Grand Est in north-eastern France.

History  
At the beginning of the Meuse-Argonne Offensive (26 September – 11 November 1918), the 79th US Infantry Division captured Charpentry.

See also
Communes of the Meuse department

References

External links  

 1918: a Canon de 155mm GPF after a direct hit

Communes of Meuse (department)